Alexandra Dapolito Dunn (born September 25, 1967) is an American environmental lawyer and law professor, specializing in chemical and pesticide regulation, water quality issues, water treatment issues, urban development, rule of law, environmental justice, environmental conflict resolution, cooperative federalism, and implementation of the Clean Water Act and the Frank R. Lautenberg Chemical Safety for the 21st Century Act. Dunn was an executive at several environmental management associations, and served as Regional Administrator for New England in the US Environmental Protection Agency (EPA), and Assistant Administrator for EPA's Office of Chemical Safety and Pollution Prevention.

Biography
Dunne graduated from Cherry Hill East High School in New Jersey in 1985. She received a B.A. in political science from James Madison University, followed by a J.D. from the Columbus School of Law, where she was elected editor-in-chief of the law review. She is a member of the bar in D.C., Maryland, and New York, and the U.S. Supreme Court. She began her career employed in private practice as an environmental associate at Winston & Strawn. She was subsequently a counsel for the American Chemistry Council, general counsel for the National Association of Clean Water Agencies (NACWA), executive director and general counsel of the Association of Clean Water Administrators, and executive director and general counsel of the Environmental Council of the States.

Professional career
Following her service at the EPA, Dunn became a partner in the law firm of Baker Botts, LLP in its Environment, Safety, and Incident Response group. At Baker Botts, she has helped to refine and deploy the "ACELAS" model for environmental justice and published numerous articles on contaminants of emerging concern, community engagement, and environmental enforcement.

Before joining the EPA in January 2018, Dunn was the executive director and general counsel of the Environmental Council of the States. She has been involved in over 25 environmental cases representing parties and intervenors and contributing amicus curiae briefs.

Dunn served as chair of the American Bar Association Section of Environment, Energy, and Resources, and served on the ABA Presidential Task force on Sustainable Development. Dunn was the first ABA section chair from the non-profit sector. She was a board member of the Environmental Law Institute from 2014 to December 2017, and on the Executive Committee of the American College of Environmental Lawyers from October 2016 to December 2017.

Dunn served as the EPA Region 1 administrator between 2018 and 2019, and was Assistant Administrator for EPA's Office of Chemical Safety and Pollution Prevention between 2019 and 2021.

Academic career
Dunn was Dean of Environmental Law Programs and an adjunct professor of law at Pace Law School. At Pace, Dunn led efforts to create the nation's first L.L.M. in Environmental Law focused on climate change. Dunn is a lecturer in law at the Columbus School of Law and Catholic University of America, and a Professorial Lecturer in Law at George Washington University Law School. Previously she was an associate professor of law at American University’s Washington College of Law. She has published articles in a variety of scholarly journals, law reviews, and periodicals. Her research publications include cutting edge work on environmental justice, green infrastructure, and environmental conflict resolution, among other subjects.

References

1967 births
American environmental lawyers
Columbus School of Law faculty
Washington College of Law faculty
Pace University faculty
Columbus School of Law alumni
James Madison University alumni
Living people
American lawyers
People of the United States Environmental Protection Agency
Trump administration personnel